Ceroplesis hamiltoni is a species of beetle in the family Cerambycidae. It was described by Per Olof Christopher Aurivillius in 1915 and is known from Kenya.

References

hamiltoni
Beetles described in 1915